Kasper Andersen (born 22 August 1998) is a Danish speedway rider who currently rides in Denmark for Fjelsted.

Career
He rode in the top tier of British Speedway, riding for the King's Lynn Stars in the SGB Premiership 2019. He was unable to race for the Redcar Bears in the SGB Championship 2021 following difficulties over a permit. In a twist of fate however, Andersen was drafted in as a replacement for Coty Garcia at Berwick Bandits, who was stranded in his homeland Argentina since the start of the season due to travel restrictions. 

In August 2021, Kasper then signed for SGB Premiership team Kings Lynn Stars. In 2022, he rode for the Redcar Bears in the SGB Championship 2022.

References 

1998 births
Living people
Danish speedway riders
King's Lynn Stars riders
Redcar Bears riders
Sheffield Tigers riders